Super Intelligence may refer to:

Superintelligence, a hypothetical agent that possesses intelligence far surpassing that of human minds
Superintelligence: Paths, Dangers, Strategies, a 2014 book
Superintelligence (film), a 2020 film